She's for Me is a 1943 American musical film directed by Reginald LeBorg and starring Grace McDonald and David Bruce.

Plot 
Two attorneys are attracted to the same client

Cast 
 Grace McDonald as Jan Lawton
 David Bruce as Michael Reed
 Lois Collier as Eileen Crane
 George Dolenz as Phil Norwin
 Charles Dingle as Crane
 Helen Brown as Miss Carpenter
 Douglas Wood as Milbourne
 Leon Belasco as Acton
 Mantan Moreland as Sam
 Charles Coleman as Clark
 Frank Faylen as Keys
 Charles Trowbridge as Dr. Folsom
 Ray Corrigan as Gorilla Man
 Grace Hayle as Dowager
 Carol Hughes as Maxine LaVerne

External links
She's for Me at IMDb
She's for Me at TCMDB
She's for Me at British Film Institute

1943 films
1943 musical films
American black-and-white films
Universal Pictures films
American musical films
Films directed by Reginald Le Borg
1940s English-language films
1940s American films